State may refer to:

Arts, entertainment, and media

Literature
 State Magazine, a monthly magazine published by the U.S. Department of State
 The State (newspaper), a daily newspaper in Columbia, South Carolina, United States
 Our State, a monthly magazine published in North Carolina and formerly called The State
 The State (Larry Niven), a fictional future government in three novels by Larry Niven

Music

Groups and labels
 States Records, an American record label
 The State (band), Australian band previously known as the Cutters

Albums
 State (album), a 2013 album by Todd Rundgren
 States (album), a 2013 album by the Paper Kites
 States, a 1991 album by Klinik
 The State (album), a 1999 album by Nickelback

Television
 The State (American TV series), 1993
 The State (British TV series), 2017

Other
 State Theatre (disambiguation), several theatres
 The State (comedy troupe), an American comedy troupe

Law and politics
 State (polity), a centralized political organization that imposes and enforces rules over a population within a territory.
Sovereign state, a sovereign political entity in international law, commonly referred to as a "country"
List of sovereign states
Nation state, a state (usually sovereign) in which the great majority identify as a single culture (often defined as an ethnic group)
 Constituent state, a type of political subdivision of a nation
 Federated state, a constituent state that is part of a federal model and shares sovereignty with the federal government
 States and union territories of India, constituent states of the Republic of India
 States and territories of Australia, constituent states of Australia
 States of Brazil, constituent states of Brazil
 States of Germany, constituent states of Germany
 States of Mexico, constituent states of Mexico
 States of Nigeria, constituent states of Nigeria
 States of South Sudan, constituent states of South Sudan
 States of Sudan, constituent states of Sudan
 States of Austria, constituent states of Austria
 States and federal territories of Malaysia, constituent monarchies and territories of Malaysia
 States of Micronesia, constituent states of Micronesia
 States and regions of Somalia, constituent states of Somalia
 States of Venezuela, constituent states of Venezuela
 U.S. state, any constituent state of the United States
 States of Palau
 States of Myanmar
 Rechtsstaat, the legal state (constitutional state, state subordinated to law) in the philosophy of law and as a principle of many national constitutions
 The Estates or the States, a national assembly of the estates of the realm, an early form of legislature that was common throughout feudal Europe
 United States Department of State, a division of the executive branch of the United States federal government, dealing with foreign affairs; sometimes referred to as "State", for short, in American political jargon.

Locations
 State College, Pennsylvania, a city in the United States, often referred to informally as "State"
 State College Area High School, or "State High"
 State station, subway station in Boston
 State station (CTA), in Chicago

Mathematics
 State (controls), a term related to control theory
 State (functional analysis), a positive linear functional on an operator algebra
 State, in dynamical systems, is a fixed rule describing the time dependence of a point in a geometrical space

Science and technology

Computing
 State (computer science), a unique configuration of information in a program or machine
 Program state, in computer science, a snapshot of the measure of various conditions in the system
 State (website), semantic web platform created by London, UK-based Equal Media Ltd
 State pattern, in computer science, a behavioral design pattern

Healthcare
 Medical state, one's current state of health, usually within a hospital
 Mental state

Physics and chemistry
 State, a complete description of a system in classical mechanics
 Chemical state, the electronic, chemical and physical nature of an element
 Quantum state, the state of a quantum mechanical system given by a vector in the underlying Hilbert space
 Stationary state, an eigenvector of a Hamiltonian
 State of matter, solid, liquid or gaseous phases of matter; describing the organization of matter in a phase
 Thermodynamic state, a set of physical quantities describing variable properties of a given thermodynamic system

Printing
 State (printmaking), distinct revisions of a work by a deliberate change to the print master

Universities
Ball State University, in Muncie, United States
 Michigan State University, in East Lansing, United States
 Michigan State Spartans, the athletic teams, commonly referred to as "State"

Other uses
 State (theology), a degree or stage of perfection in the Christian religion
 States (automobile), cyclecar manufactured by the States Cyclecar Co of Detroit, Michigan in 1915

See also
 Condition (disambiguation)
 Government, the system by which a state or community is controlled
 New states (disambiguation)
 Stateless (disambiguation)
 Status (disambiguation)
 The States (disambiguation)